The United States Senate election in Illinois of 1950 was held on November 7, 1950 to elect one of Illinois's members to the United States Senate. Republican Everett Dirksen defeated incumbent Democratic Senator and Senate Majority Leader Scott W. Lucas, who had been seeking a third term.

Election information
The primaries and general election coincided with those for House and state elections.

Primaries were held on April 11.

Democratic primary

Republican primary

General election
Dirksen carried 82 of the state's 102 counties. Among the 88 counties that Dirksen won was the state's most populous county, Cook County, in which Dirksen won with 50.01% to Lucas' 49.60%. Despite losing in Cook County, Lucas performed better in the county than he did in the cumulative vote of the remaining 101 counties, where Dirksen won 57.56% to Lucas' 42.13%. 54.54% of the votes cast in the election were from Cook County.

See also 
 1950 United States Senate elections

References 

Illinois
United States Senate
United States Senate elections in Illinois